Peter Boenisch (4 May 1927 in Berlin – 8 July 2005 in Gmund am Tegernsee) was a German columnist and journalist.

Life
Boenisch worked as journalist for German newspaper Bild, where he became in 1961 editor-in-chief. He was the founder of magazine Bravo. From 1978 to 1981 he worked for German newspaper Die Welt. From 19 May 1983 to 14 June 1985 Boenisch was speaker of Helmut Kohl's German cabinet. In 2001, he became president of organisation Union-Clubs von 1867. Boenisch married three times.

Awards 
 Bavarian Order of Merit
 2003: Order of Merit of the Federal Republic of Germany

References

External links 

 
 Sprecher mit beschränkter Vollmacht, by Gerhard Spörl in Zeit, Nr. 11, 9 March 1984

German journalists
German male journalists
20th-century German journalists
21st-century German journalists
1927 births
2005 deaths
Bild people
Die Welt editors
German magazine founders
German newspaper journalists
Deaths from cancer in Germany
Commanders Crosses of the Order of Merit of the Federal Republic of Germany
Writers from Berlin